Kim Dong-hyeon (born 14 July 1994) is a South Korean professional footballer who plays as midfielder. He last played for Siheung Citizen FC in the 2018 K3 League Basic.

Career
Born in 1994, Kim is a Pohang Steelers youth product and played there from 2010 to 2012 before moving to Dong-a University team 2013.

Pohang Steelers
He began his professional club career at the K League Classic side Pohang Steelers in January 2016. The South Korean midfielder has represented Steelers in the 2016 AFC Champions League where he faced teams such as Sydney FC, Guangzhou Evergrande and the Japanese powerhouse Urawa Red Diamonds.

Gangneung City
In 2017 he signed with Gangneung City FC on loan from Pohang Steelers. He appeared in 14 K3 League matches with Gangneung until his end of loan.

Chennai City
In February 2018 he joined I-League club Chennai City as a replacement for Uzbek recruit Aman Talantbekov.

He made his debut in a 0–0 draw against Mohun Bagan.

With Chennai City, He also appeared in the Hero Super Cup in 2018 and the continental tournament 2018 AFC Cup.

Siheung Citizen
In 2018, he returned to Korea and signed with K4 League outfit Siheung Citizen FC, with which he appeared in 12 league matches and emerged as the champions of the 2018 K3 League Basic.

Honours
Siheung Citizen
K3 League Basic  Champions (1): 2018

References

External links 

1994 births
Living people
Association football midfielders
South Korean footballers
Pohang Steelers players
K League 1 players
Chennai City FC players
I-League players